KNBR may refer to:

 KNBR (AM), a radio station (680 AM) licensed to serve San Francisco, California, United States
 KNBR-FM, a radio station (104.5 FM) licensed to serve San Francisco, California